Sergis Kyratzis (born 12 May 1995) is a Cypriot tennis player.

Kyratzis has a career high ATP singles ranking of 1399 achieved on 14 September 2015. He also has a career high ATP doubles ranking of 925 achieved on 17 February 2020. Kyratzis has won one ITF doubles title on the tour. 

Kyratzis represents Cyprus at the Davis Cup, where he has a win–loss record of 8–9.

References

External links
 
 
 

1995 births
Living people
Cypriot male tennis players